Vadim Anatolevich Khlopotov (born April 22, 1994) is a Russian professional ice hockey player. He is currently playing with Saryarka Karaganda of the Supreme Hockey League (VHL).

In season 2011–12, he was trying himself in Ontario Hockey League where he played for Saginaw Spirit. Vadim Khlopotov played 52 games of the season in which he scored 2 goals and 6 assists, had 24 penalty minutes and -20, according to the +/- system. His Kontinental Hockey League (KHL) debut was playing with Lokomotiv Yaroslavl during the 2013–14 KHL season.

References

External links

1994 births
Living people
Atlant Moscow Oblast players
HC CSKA Moscow players
Lokomotiv Yaroslavl players
Russian ice hockey left wingers
People from Nizhny Tagil
Saginaw Spirit players
HC Sibir Novosibirsk players
HC Sochi players
Sportspeople from Sverdlovsk Oblast